Wallach  or Vlach is a blanket term covering several modern Latin peoples descending from the Latinised population in Central, Eastern and Southeast Europe.

Wallach may also refer to:

 Wallach (crater), a small lunar impact crater
 6670 Wallach, a main-belt asteroid
 Wallach IX, a fictional planet in Frank Herbert's science fiction universe of Dune
 Wallach Hall, a dormitory on the campus of Columbia University

People with the surname 
 Benjamin Wallach (1873–1935), South African cricketer
 Chad Wallach (born 1991), American baseball player
 Clarrie Wallach (1889-1918) and Neville Wallach (1896-1918), Australian rugby union players who were awarded the Military Cross during World War I
 Eli Wallach (1915–2014), American actor
 Evan Wallach, American judge, expert on war crimes
Hanna Wallach (born 1979), computational social scientist
 Ira Wallach (writer) (1913–1995), American screenwriter and novelist
 Ira D. Wallach (1909–2007), American businessman and philanthropist
 John Wallach (1943–2002), American journalist, author and editor
 Lori Wallach, director and founder of Global Trade Watch
 Maxim Litvinov or Max Wallach (1876–1951), Russian revolutionary and Soviet diplomat
 Moshe Wallach (1866–1957), German Jewish / Israeli physician
 Otto Wallach (1847–1931), German chemist, Nobel Prize winner
 Richard Wallach (1816–1881), American politician
 Steve Wallach (born 1945), American computer architecture engineer and company founder
 Theresa Wallach (1909-1999), motorcyclist, engineer, and author
 Tim Wallach (born 1957), American former baseball player
 Van Wallach (born 1947), American herpetologist
 William Douglas Wallach (1812–1871), American surveyor and newspaper entrepreneur
 Yochanan Vollach or Jochanan Wallach, (born 1945), Israeli former footballer
 Yona Wallach (1944–1985), Israeli poet

See also 
 Wallach rearrangement, an organic reaction converting an azoxy compound to an azo compound
 Wallach reform, 16th century land reform in Lithuanian lands
 Walhaz, the Germanic root
 Walloons,  the French-speaking population of Belgium, with a name also coming from Walhaz root
 Welsh people, an ethnic group and nation associated with Wales and the Welsh language, with a name also coming from Walhaz root
 Wallack, a term or name related to Wallach
 Wallich, an unrelated, but phonetically similar name
 Wallace (surname)
 Wallachia (disambiguation)
 Oláh (disambiguation)
 Volokh (disambiguation)
 French people, the descendants of the Gauls. The word Gaul may possibly have been from the Walhaz root

Ethnonymic surnames